Alexander Moller may refer to:

 Alex Möller (1903–1985), German politician (SPD)
 Alexander von Moller (1796–1862), Imperial Russian division commander
 Alexander Jackson Møller (born 1990), Danish football defender